The 2020 Super League Grand Final was the 23rd official Grand Final and championship-deciding game of Super League XXV. The game was won 8–4 by St Helens over their local rivals Wigan Warriors. Due to the COVID-19 pandemic, it was the first Super League Grand Final not held at Old Trafford.

Stadium selection
Initially, Old Trafford was confirmed as the venue for the 2020 Super League Grand Final, with the Premier League scheduling Manchester United's tie against Southampton, on the same day, to be played away at St Mary's Stadium in order to allow Old Trafford to accommodate the Grand Final. However with an increasing number of positive COVID-19 tests in rugby league players and match postponements approaching the game, Manchester United and the Super League withdrew from the agreement on 17 October as Old Trafford would be unable to accommodate a change in date with them hosting İstanbul Başakşehir and Paris Saint Germain midweek either side of the Grand Final weekend in the Champions League. On 22 October it was announced that the game would be played at the KCOM Stadium, Hull on Friday 27 November with an 8pm kick-off. Criticism was met with the selection of KCOM as the venue, with some people saying it was a poor attempt to expand rugby league's reach, whereas other were saying it was the most iconic Super League stadium and that stadium selection did not matter as fans were not allowed to attend.

Background
The two finalists finished first and second in the regular season with Wigan winning 13 of their 17 games and St Helens 12 out of 17. These league positions earned both clubs byes to the second (semi-final) round of the play-offs and home advantage in their semi-final matches.

Route to the final

Wigan Warriors
Wigan finished first in the regular season, to claim their first League Leaders Shield since 2012, and a first trophy for head coach, Adrian Lam. In their semi-final they played Hull F.C. the lowest ranked winning team from the elimination finals. Wigan won the match 29–2, with tries from Joe Burgess, Harry Smith, Zak Hardaker, Jake Bibby and Bevan French to reach the grand final, for an 11th time.

St Helens
Reigning and defending champions St Helens finished second in the regular season against Catalans Dragons the higher ranked winning team from the elimination finals. St Helens won the match 48–2, to reach the grand final, for a record 12th time.

Match details 

Both teams normal kit colours are red and white, but with Wigan having finished higher in the league, they were the 'home team' which meant that they were playing in their normal red and white colours, with St Helens playing in their alternate blue and white kit.

The game was the lowest scoring grand final in the history of Super League, but has been described as one of the greatest and most dramatic grand finals.

In a game dominated by defences, there was no scoring until the last minute of the first half, when St Helens were awarded a penalty for a shoulder charge by Morgan Smithies on Lachlan Coote. Coote took the kick himself to give St Helens a 2–0 half-time lead.  The closest effort to a try had seen Wigan's Zak Hardaker prevented from scoring by five St Helens defenders, when he was held-up over the St Helens goal line after 28 minutes

The second half continued in the same fashion, with scoring opportunities limited. St Helens thought they had scored on 55 minutes, when Zeb Taia grounded a kick from James Roby, but referee Chris Kendall disallowed the try for offside, a decision confirmed by video referee Ben Thaler.

Wigan's Jake Bibby finally scored the first try of the game, after 66 minutes when he touched down in the corner. Hardaker's conversion attempt bounced off the crossbar to give Wigan a 4–2 lead. With less than 10 minutes left, St Helens were awarded another penalty as Jackson Hastings was adjudged to have high tackled Theo Fages. Coote made his second successful kick to level the scores up at 4–4. In the 78th minute, Wigan were awarded a penalty when Theo Fages was ruled offside. From just inside the Saints half of the field, Hardaker's kick drifted right of the goalposts, leaving the scores tied. As the game went into its final seconds, Saints winger Tommy Makinson attempted a drop goal, and as the hooter sounded the end of the game, the ball bounced back off the goal post, and bounced into the Wigan in-goal area, where St Helens centre Jack Welsby out-sprinted Wigan fullback Bevan French to score the match winning try.

Notes

References

Super League Grand Finals
Rugby league in England
Super League Grand Final
Grand Final
Wigan Warriors matches
St Helens R.F.C. matches
Sport in Kingston upon Hull